1972 in philosophy

Events

Publications
 Davidson, D. and Harman, G. (ed.) Semantics of Natural Language, Dordrecht; Boston: Reidel
 Deleuze, Gilles and Guattari, Félix, L'anti-Oedipe, (Paris: Les Editions de Minuit, 1972).
 Kripke, Saul, "Naming and Necessity."   (Published separately in 1980; setting out the causal theory of reference.)
 Lakoff, George, "Linguistics and Natural Logic."
 Stalnaker, Robert, "Pragmatics."
 Dreyfus, Hubert, What Computers Can't Do: The Limits of Artificial Intelligence (Rev. ed., 1979)
 Kahneman, Daniel and Tversky, Amos, "Subjective probability", Cognitive Psychology 3:430–454
 Popper, Karl, Objective Knowledge: An Evolutionary Approach (Rev. ed., 1979)

Births
 May 13 - Mohammed Chaouki Zine
 October 1 - Mantas Adomėnas
 December 24 - Ingo Zechner
 Austin Dacey
 Edward Jones-Imhotep
 Erik Del Bufalo, Venezuelan philosopher

Deaths
 January 5 - Paul Diel (born 1893)
 February 14 - Gerhard Krüger (philosopher) (born 1902)
 February 17 - Ion Petrovici (born 1882)
 February 29 - Pietro Ubaldi (born 1886)
 May 1 - Stephen Pepper (born 1891)
 August 20 - Nichifor Crainic (born 1889)
 October 23 - John Daniel Wild (born 1902)
 November 17 - Eugène Minkowski (born 1885)
 December 23 - Abraham Joshua Heschel (born 1907)
 Gregorio Bermann
 Zhu Qianzhi

References

Philosophy
20th-century philosophy
Philosophy by year